A title track is a song that has the same name as the album or film in which it appears. In the Korean music industry, the term is used to describe a promoted song on an album, akin to a single, regardless of the song's title.

Title track may also refer to:

Music 
 "Title Track", a song by Death Cab for Cutie from their 2000 album We Have the Facts and We're Voting Yes
 "The Title Track", a song by The Fold from their 2006 album This Too Shall Pass (album)
 "Title Track", a song by Okkervil River from their 2007 album The Stage Names
 "Title Track", a song by Polvo from their 1995 EP This Eclipse
 "Title Track", a song by Amos the Transparent from their 2007 album Everything I've Forgotten to Forget
 "Title Track", a song by Machine Gun Kelly from his 2020 album Tickets to My Downfall
 Title Tracks, the indie pop/rock solo project of Washington, D.C.-based musician John Davis

Sports
 The pursuit of a title or the process of winning a title. Often used as "on the title track".